In field theory, the Stueckelberg action (named after Ernst Stueckelberg) describes a massive spin-1 field as an R (the real numbers are the Lie algebra of U(1)) Yang–Mills theory coupled to a real scalar field φ. This scalar field takes on values in a real 1D affine representation of R with m as the coupling strength.

This is a special case of the Higgs mechanism, where, in effect,  and thus the mass of the Higgs scalar excitation has been taken to infinity, so the Higgs has decoupled and can be ignored, resulting in a nonlinear,  affine representation of the field, instead of a linear representation — in contemporary terminology, a U(1) nonlinear -model.

Gauge-fixing φ=0, yields the Proca action.

This explains why, unlike the case for non-abelian vector fields, quantum electrodynamics with a massive photon is, in fact, renormalizable, even though it is not manifestly gauge invariant (after the Stückelberg scalar has been eliminated in the Proca action).

Stueckelberg extension of the Standard Model
The Stueckelberg extension of the Standard Model (StSM) consists of a gauge invariant kinetic term for a massive U(1) gauge field. Such a term can be implemented into the Lagrangian of the Standard Model
without destroying the renormalizability of the theory and further provides a mechanism for
mass generation that is distinct from the Higgs mechanism in the context of Abelian gauge theories.

The model involves a non-trivial
mixing of the Stueckelberg and the Standard Model sectors by including an additional term in the effective Lagrangian of the Standard Model given by 

After symmetry breaking in the electroweak sector the photon remains massless. The model predicts a new type of gauge boson dubbed  which inherits a very distinct narrow decay width in this model. The St sector of the StSM decouples from the SM in limit .

Stueckelberg type couplings arise quite naturally in theories involving compactifications of higher-dimensional string theory, in particular, these couplings appear in the dimensional reduction of the ten-dimensional N = 1 supergravity coupled to supersymmetric Yang–Mills gauge fields in the presence of internal gauge fluxes. In the context of intersecting D-brane model building, products of U(N) gauge groups are broken to their SU(N) subgroups via the Stueckelberg couplings and thus the Abelian gauge fields become massive. Further, in a much simpler fashion one may consider a model with only one extra dimension (a type of Kaluza–Klein model) and compactify down to a four-dimensional theory. The resulting Lagrangian will contain massive vector gauge bosons that acquire masses through the Stueckelberg mechanism.

See also
 Higgs mechanism#Affine Higgs mechanism

References

The edited PDF files of the physics course of Professor Stueckelberg, openly accessible, with commentary and complete biographical documents.
Review:Stueckelberg Extension of the Standard Model and the MSSM
 Daniel Feldman, Zuowei Liu, Pran Nath: , 

Gauge theories
Physics beyond the Standard Model
Symmetry
Theoretical physics